Samuel Perry Dinsmoor (March 8, 1843 – July 21, 1932) was an American teacher and eccentric sculptor from Lucas, Kansas, United States.

Early life
Dinsmoor was born near Coolville, Ohio. He served in the Civil War for three years in the Union Army, during which he witnessed eighteen major battles, among them the Battle of Gettysburg. After the war, he worked as a schoolteacher in Illinois for five years. He later took up farming and moved to Kansas in 1888. He briefly moved to Nebraska in 1890 only to return to Kansas the following year. He retired in 1905 and began a second career as a sculptor.

Garden of Eden
Dinsmoor built and moved into a log cabin on a lot that he named the Garden of Eden in Lucas, Kansas. The cabin is a twelve-room house; the logs are made up of limestone quarried near Wilson Lake. Dinsmoor designed his landscape and spent the rest of his life creating the garden, which contains over 200 concrete sculptures. The sculptures and design of the house reflect Dinsmoor's belief in the Populist movement and his religious convictions, it includes a Labor Crucified figure that is surrounded by the people who put him on the Cross, a doctor, lawyer, preacher and capitalist.

The final resting place for Dinsmoor and his first wife, Frances A. Barlow Journey, is inside the mausoleum in one corner of the lot. As part of a tour, visitors are allowed to view Dinsmoor in his concrete coffin, which is sealed behind a glass wall. Inside the mausoleum is also a double-exposed photo of a live Dinsmoor viewing his deceased body inside the coffin.

The garden is open to the public and is on the National Register of Historic Places.

Personal life
Dinsmoor married Frances A. Barlow Journey on August 24, 1870. After she died in 1917, he married Emilie Brozek; he was 81 and she was 22 at the time. They had two children, John William Dinsmoor (1928-2013) and Emily Jane Dinsmoor Stevens (1924-2013). His son John was a Colonel in the United States Air Force and served in the Vietnam War.

See also
 Ferdinand Cheval
 Enoch Tanner Wickham
 Howard Finster
 Simon Rodia

References

External links
Garden of Eden

1843 births
1932 deaths
People from Russell County, Kansas
20th-century American sculptors
American male sculptors
20th-century American male artists
Artists from Kansas
Sculptors from Kansas